The New Zealand eagle ray or Australian eagle ray (Myliobatis tenuicaudatus) is an eagle ray of the family Myliobatidae, found in bays, estuaries, and near rocky reefs  around New Zealand and southern Australia on the inner continental shelf. It is a common species and the International Union for Conservation of Nature has assessed its conservation status as being of "least concern".

Taxonomy
Myliobatis tenuicaudatus was first described in 1877 by the Scottish naturalist James Hector who was director of the geological survey of New Zealand; the fish was thought to be endemic to New Zealand. Subsequently, in 1881, the Australian zoologist William John Macleay described Myliobatis australis from the waters of Southern Australia as a new species. In a generic revision in 2014, W.T. White determined that the two are synonymous, and that M. australis is a junior synonym of M. tenuicaudatus.

Description
The New Zealand eagle ray is a cartilaginous fish with a roughly circular disc-like body, a projecting frog-like head, large fleshy pectoral fins and a long tail armed with a spine that is capable of injecting venom. The pectoral fins beat up and down so that the fish appears to "fly" through the water. The dorsal surface is olive-green, dark brown or yellowish, with grey or pale blue markings, and the ventral surface is white.

Distribution
This ray is native to the waters around both North and South Island in New Zealand, the Kermadec Islands, Norfolk Island and southern Australia, where it occurs in Queensland, New South Wales, Victoria, Tasmania, South Australia and Western Australia. It is usually found on the inner continental shelf, on sandy flats and seagrass meadows, in estuaries and bays and near rocky reefs.

Ecology
A benthopelagic species, it feeds on such invertebrates as clams, oysters, crabs and worms that it finds on the seabed. The prey is crushed with the teeth and the hard fragments rejected. By means of electro-sensory organs on the head, it is able to detect prey completely submerged in sand or mud; a jet of water is blown out of the gill slits, exposing the mollusc or other prey.

This fish produces live young, with litter sizes varying between two and twenty, with an average of six young. Before they are born, the young feed on the egg yolks, and later on exudations from the maternal uterus.

Status
M. tenuicaudatus is a common species and is sometimes caught as bycatch in coastal fisheries. Traditionally such caught fish have mostly been discarded, but they are sometimes retained for human consumption. The fish seem capable of recovering when released and in general, numbers of fish are fairly stable. This fish is present in a number of marine protected areas and the International Union for Conservation of Nature has assessed its conservation status as being of "least concern". In June 2018 the New Zealand Department of Conservation classified the New Zealand eagle ray as "Not Threatened" with the qualifiers "Data Poor" and "Secure Overseas" under the New Zealand Threat Classification System.

References

Myliobatis
Marine fish of New Zealand
Ovoviviparous fish
Fish described in 1877